The Marked One is a 1963 British crime film directed by Francis Searle and starring William Lucas (who starred in several crime b-movies at this time), Zena Walker and Patrick Jordan. The screenplay concerns a forger whose daughter is threatened by other criminals.

Plot summary
A forger's daughter is threatened by other criminals, forcing him to take drastic action.

Cast
 William Lucas as Don Mason
 Zena Walker as Kay Mason
 Patrick Jordan as Inspector Mayne
 Laurie Leigh as Maisie
 David Gregory as Ed Jones
 Arthur Lovegrove as Benson
 Marianne Stone as Mrs. Benson
 Kim Tracy as Wanda
 Edward Ogden as Nevil Stone
 Frederick Peisley as Mossie 
 Dorothy Gordon as Ruby 
 Frank Sieman as Lacey
 Brian Nissen as Charles Warren
 Lynn Pinkney as Sally
 Richard McNeff as Inspector Rogers

References

External links

1963 films
1963 crime films
British crime films
Films directed by Francis Searle
Films shot at MGM-British Studios
1960s English-language films
1960s British films